Lamar is an unincorporated community in Clay Township, Spencer County, in the U.S. state of Indiana.

History

A post office has been in operation at Lamar since 1888.

Geography

References

Unincorporated communities in Spencer County, Indiana
Unincorporated communities in Indiana